The New 36th Division was a cavalry division in the National Revolutionary Army. It was created in 1932 by the Kuomintang for General Ma Zhongying, who was also its first commander. It was made almost entirely out of Hui Muslim troops, all of its officers were Hui, with a few thousand Uighurs forced conscripts in the rank and file. It was commonly referred to as the "KMT 36th Division", or "Tungan 36th Division".

Original organization 

General Ma Zhongying, a Muslim who had trained under Chiang Kai-shek at Whampoa Military Academy in Nanjing in 1929, was the new 36th Division commander.

Kamal Kaya Efendi, a Turk and a former Ottoman military officer was chief-of-staff to Ma Zhongying. The 1st Brigade was commanded by General Ma Ju-lung. The 2nd Brigade was commanded by General Ma Sheng-kuei.

Cavalry regiments were divided into 2,000 men each, by horse color, black, brown, or white.
Infantry then followed cavalry.

Su Chin-shou was General Ma Zhancang's chief of staff.
Pai Tzu-li was another commander in the new 36th division.

An unnamed new 36th division general was encountered by Peter Fleming.

Ma Hushan was original Deputy Divisional Commander, then promoted to Chief of the new 36th division.

Equipment 
Primary equipment consisted of Dadao swords, bolt-action Lee–Enfield rifles, captured Soviet rifles, machine guns, and light cannons.

Soviet rifles marked with 1930 dates were seized by Chinese Muslim soldiers from Russians during the Soviet Invasion of Xinjiang as war booty.

Uniform and Insignia 

Ma Zhancang's troops wore green uniforms. Many of the troops wore Kuomintang Blue Sky with a White Sun armbands, and used Kuomintang Blue Sky with a White Sun banners.

Training 

Ma Zhongying made his men train in subzero temperatures, and they used shadow fencing to train and parallel bars for exercise. Ma Hushan forced his men to drill every day, conducting siege maneuvers and cavalry attacks. Peter Flemings said "I have never seen troops in China train so hard."

It is documented that troops sang Chinese Muslim marching songs; Ma Zhongying himself had a harmonium with him and spent hours playing Muslim hymns on it. He also kept Mauser pistols. Ma Zhongying cited as his role models Genghis Khan, Napoleon, Bismarck, Hindenburg, and Zuo Zongtang.

Recruitment Tactics

Xinjiang War

Kizil massacre 
Uighur and Kirghiz Turkic fighters broke their agreement not to attack a column of retreating Han Chinese and Chinese Muslim soldiers from Kashgar.

Battle of Aksu 
A minor battle in which Chinese Muslim troops were expelled from the Aksu oases of Xinjiang by Uyghurs when they rose up in revolt.

Battle of Sekes Tash 
A minor battle when Chinese Muslim troops under general Ma Zhancang attacked and inflicted a defeat upon Uyghur and Kirghiz armies at Sekes Tesh. About 200 Uyghur and Kirghiz were killed.

Battle of Kashgar (1933) 
Uyghur and Kirghiz forces led by the Bughra brothers and Tawfiq Bay attempted to take the city of Kashgar from Chinese Muslim troops under General Ma Zhancang. They were defeated.

Han Chinese troops commanded by Brigadier Yang were absorbed into Ma Zhancang's army. A number of Han Chinese officers were spotted wearing the green uniforms of Ma Zhancang's unit of the new 36th division, presumably they had converted to Islam.

Battle of Urumqi 
The new 36th division twice (First Battle of Urumqi and Second Battle of Urumqi) attempted to take the city of Urumqi, the second time, they were joined by a Han Chinese army under Zhang Peiyuan.

Battle of Tutung 
In 1934, 2 brigades of Soviet Gosudarstvennoye Politicheskoye Upravlenie (GPU) troops of about 7,000 backed by tanks, planes, and artillery with mustard gas, attacked the new 36th division near Tutung. The battle raged for several weeks on the Tutung frozen river. New 36th division troops dressed up in sheepskins in the snow, and charged Soviet machine gun posts with swords to defeat a Soviet pincer attack. Soviet planes bombed the 36th division with mustard gas. Heavy casualties mounted on both sides before Ma Zhongying ordered the 36th division to withdraw.

Battle of Dawan Cheng 
Ma Zhongying encountered a Soviet armored car column of a few hundred soldiers near Dawan Cheng. The new 36th division wiped out nearly the entire column, after engaging the Soviet in savage hand-to-hand combat, and rolled the wrecked Soviet armored cars off the mountainsides. When a White Russian force showed up, Ma Zhongying withdrew.

Battle of Kashgar (1934) 

New 36th division General Ma Fuyuan stormed Kashgar, and attacked the Uighur and Kirghiz rebels of the First East Turkestan Republic. He freed another new 36th division general, Ma Zhancang, who was trapped by the Uighurs and Kirghiz. Ma Zhancang repulsed six Uighur attacks, inflicting massive casualties on the Uighur forces. 2,000 to 8,000 Uighur civilians were killed, in revenge for the Kizil massacre. General Ma Zhongying gave a speech at Idgah mosque, reminding the Uighurs to be loyal to the Republic of China government at Nanjing. Several citizens at the British consulate were killed by the 36th division.

Battle of Yangi Hissar 
Ma Zhancang led the new 36th division to attack Uyghur forces at Yangi Hissar, wiping out the entire Uighur force, and killing the Emir Nur Ahmad Jan Bughra.

Battle of Yarkand 
Ma Zhancang defeated the Uighur and Afghan volunteers sent by king Mohammed Zahir Shah, and exterminated them all. The emir Abdullah Bughra was killed and beheaded, his head put on display at Idgah mosque.

Charkhlik Revolt 
The new 36th division under General Ma Hushan crushed a revolt by the Uighurs in the Charkhlik oasis.

Administration of Tunganistan 
The new 36th division under General Ma Hushan administered the oases of southern Xinjiang, and their administration was dubbed Tunganistan by Western travelers. Ma Hushan and the new 36th division declared their loyalty to the Kuomintang government in Nanjing and sent emissaries to Nanjing requesting aid to fight against Sheng Shicai's provincial forces and the Soviet Union.

The administration which was set up was colonial in nature, the Chinese Muslims started putting up street signs and names in Chinese, which used to be in only Uighur language. They also sought to live a Chinese lifestyle, importing Chinese cooks and baths. Islam barely played a role except as a "vague spiritual focus" for unified opposition against Sheng Shicai and the Soviet Union.

The Uyghurs in the Charklik oases revolted against the new 36th division in 1935, and the Chinese Muslims crushed the Uyghur insurgents, executed 100 people, and took the family of the Uyghur chief as hostages.

Camels were requisitioned by the new 36th Division in Cherchen.

Aftermath 

In May 1937, New 36th Division acting Division Commander Ma Hushan launched a military operation against Sheng Shicai, Siege Kashgar, capture Bachu, and vanguard approaches Aksu. Sheng Shicai request Soviet help. September 1937, three Soviet regiment entry from Artush, defeat Ma Hushan at Bachu, direct to Kashgar and Yarkand, The new 36th division retreats to Hotan, Ma Hushan in early September when the Soviet army occupied Pishan, Abandoned troops and fled to India. The New 36th Division has disintegrated from now on.

References 

Divisions of the National Revolutionary Army